Unwired: Africa is a world music benefit compilation album originally released in 2000, with proceeds going to Amnesty International. Part of the World Music Network Rough Guides series, the release features African acoustic music, from traditional to pop. The compilation was produced and compiled by Phil Stanton, co-founder of the World Music Network. Catherine Steinmann wrote the liner notes.

Countries represented in this compilation include Mozambique, Mali, Zimbabwe, the DRC, Cape Verde, Sudan, Mali, Guinea, Mauritania, Egypt, Madagascar, and South Africa.

Critical reception

Writing for AllMusic, Bret Love called the album "consistently excellent" and "a beautiful compilation for those interested in the lighter side of African music".

Track listing

References 

2000 compilation albums
World Music Network Rough Guide albums